The Naturtex Women's Open was a tournament for professional female tennis players played on outdoor clay courts. The event was classified as a $50,000 ITF Women's Circuit tournament and was held in Szeged, Hungary, only in 2016.

Past finals

Singles

Doubles

External links 
 ITF search

ITF Women's World Tennis Tour
Clay court tennis tournaments
Tennis tournaments in Hungary
Recurring sporting events established in 2016
Recurring sporting events disestablished in 2016
Defunct sports competitions in Hungary